Genitography is the radiography of the urogenital sinus and internal duct structures after injection of a contrast medium through the opening of the sinus.

References
 Dorland's Illustrated Medical Dictionary (Twenty-sixth Edition)

Projectional radiography